Herndon is a surname. Notable people with the surname include:

Adrienne McNeil Herndon (born 1869), African American woman in Atlanta, Georgia
Alonzo Herndon (1858–1927), African-American businessman
Angelo Herndon (1913–1997), African-American communist organizer
C. Nash Herndon (1916–1998), American geneticist and eugenicist
Charles Herndon, American sculptor
Charles W. Herndon, American politician from Arizona
Chris Herndon (born 1996), American football player
David Herndon (born 1985), American professional baseball player
David R. Herndon (born 1953), United States federal judge
Don Herndon (1936–2009), American professional football player
Ellen Lewis Herndon (1837–1880), wife of the 21st President of the United States, Chester A. Arthur
Holly Herndon (born 1980), American composer, musician, and sound artist
James Herndon (writer) (1926–1990), American writer and educator
Jimmy Herndon (born 1973), American professional football player
J. Marvin Herndon (born 1944), American scientist who founded the georeactor theory
Joe Herndon (born 1949), American R&B and soul singer for The Spaniels and The Temptations
John Hunter Herndon (1813-1878), American judge and planter in antebellum Texas
Judith Herndon (1941–1980), American Senator of West Virginia
Junior Herndon (born 1978), American professional baseball player
Kelly Herndon (born 1976), American professional football player
Kenneth Herndon (born 1985), American professional baseball player
Larry Herndon (born 1953), American professional baseball player
Marcia Herndon (1941-1997), American ethnomusicologist and anthropologist
Patrick Herndon (1802–1836), American soldier who fought at the Alamo
Raymon W. Herndon (1918–1942), United States Marine Corps Navy Cross recipient
Steve Herndon (born 1977), American professional football player
Susan Herndon, American singer-song writer
Thomas Herndon (born 1985)
Thomas H. Herndon (1828–1883), U.S. Representative from Alabama
Tre Herndon (born 1996), American football player
Ty Herndon (born 1962), American country music singer
William Herndon (lawyer) (1818–1891), law partner and biographer of Abraham Lincoln
William Lewis Herndon (1813–1857), United States Navy scientist, explorer, and hero
William S. Herndon (1835–1903), U.S. Representative from Texas

See also
Hendon

fr:Herndon